Granja may refer to the following places:

Brazil 
Granja, Ceará, a municipality in Ceará
Granja Carolina, a neighborhood in Itapevi
Granja Comary, a neighbourhood in Teresópolis
Granja Viana, a neighbourhood in Barueri, Carapicuíba, Cotia, Embu das Artes and Jandira
Granja do Torto, an official residency of the President of Brazil

Chile 
La Granja, a commune in Santiago Province, Chile

Portugal 
Granja-Amareleja wine, a Portuguese wine region
Granja, São Tomé, a city in São Tomé and Príncipe
Praia da Granja, a beach in Portugal

Spain 
La Granja (Madrid Metro), a station on Line 10 of the Madrid Metro
La Granja, Spain,  municipality in Cáceres, Spain
La Granja de la Costera, a municipality in Costera, Spain
La Granja d'Escarp, a  municipality in Segrià, Spain
La Granja de San Ildefonso, a town and municipality in Segovia, Spain
Granja de Moreruela,  a municipality in Zamora, Spain
Granja de Rocamora, a village in Alicante, Spain
Granja de Torrehermosa, a municipality in Badajoz, Spain
Parque de La Granja, a park in Santa Cruz de Tenerife, Spain
Real Fábrica de Cristales de La Granja, a royal manufacturing factory in Spain
Royal Palace of La Granja de San Ildefonso, an 18th-century palace in Spain

See also
La Granja (disambiguation)